The feminist art movement refers to the efforts and accomplishments of feminists internationally to produce art that reflects women's lives and experiences, as well as to change the foundation for the production and perception of contemporary art. It also sought to bring more visibility to women within art history and art practice. By the way it is expressed to visualize the inner thoughts and objectives of the feminist movement to show to everyone and give meaning in the art. It helps construct the role to those who continue to undermine the mainstream (and often masculine) narrative of the art world. Corresponding with general developments within feminism, and often including such self-organizing tactics as the consciousness-raising group, the movement began in the 1960s and flourished throughout the 1970s as an outgrowth of the so-called second wave of feminism. It has been called "the most influential international movement of any during the postwar period."

History
The 1960s was a period when women artists wanted to gain equal rights with men within the established art world, and to create feminist art, often in non-traditional ways, to help "change the world".

Louise Bourgeois (1911-2010) and German-American Eva Hesse (1936-1970) were some early feminist artists.

On 20 July 1964 Yoko Ono, a Fluxus, avant-garde artist, singer, and activist, presented Cut Piece at the Yamaichi Concert Hall, Kyoto, Japan where she sat still as parts of her clothing were cut off of her, which meant to protest violence against women. She performed it again at Carnegie Hall in 1965. Her son, Sean, participated in the artist performance on 15 September 2013 at the Théâtre le Ranelagh in Paris.  The Guardian'''s Jonathan Jones considered it "one of the 10 most shocking performance artworks ever."

Mary Beth Edelson's Some Living American Women Artists / Last Supper (1972) appropriated Leonardo da Vinci’s The Last Supper, with the heads of notable women artists collaged over the heads of Christ and his apostles. Benglis was among those notable women artists. This image, addressing the role of religious and art historical iconography in the subordination of women, became "one of the most iconic images of the feminist art movement."

Women artists, motivated by feminist theory and the feminist movement, began the feminist art movement in the 1970s. Feminist art represented a shift away from modernism, where art made by women was put in a different class to works made by men. The movement cultivated a new feminist consciousness, a "freedom to respond to life... [Unimpeded] by traditional male mainstream." Or, as Griselda Pollock and Rozsika Parker put it—a separation of Art with a capital "A" from art made by women produced a "feminine stereotype". The Dinner Party by Judy Chicago, an art installation symbolically representing women’s history, is widely considered the first epic feminist artwork.

This demand for equality in representation was codified in the Art Workers' Coalition's (AWC) Statement of Demands, which was developed in 1969 and published in definitive form in March 1970. The AWC was set up to defend the rights of artists and force museums and galleries to reform their practices. While the coalition sprung up as a protest movement following Greek kinetic sculptor Panagiotis "Takis" Vassilakis's physical removal of his work Tele-Sculpture(1960) from a 1969 exhibition at the Museum of Modern Art, New York, it quickly issued a broad list of demands to 'art museums in general'.

Alongside calls for free admission, better representation of ethnic minorities, late openings and an agreement that galleries would not exhibit an artwork without the artist's consent, the AWC also demanded that museums 'encourage female artists to overcome centuries of damage done to the image of the female as an artist by establishing equal representation of the sexes in exhibitions, museum purchases and on selection committees'.

There are also feminist forms of postmodernism which emerged in the 1980s. The feminist art movement grew out of the struggle to find a new way to express sexual, material, social and political aspects of life, and femininity. Feminist art movements emerged in the United States;  Europe, including Spain; Australia; Canada; and Latin America in the 1970s.see Andrea Giunta's, Feminist Disruptions in Mexican Art, 1975-1987 in Number 5 .(c) Artelogie, October 2013.

The women's art movements spread world-wide in the latter half of the 20th century, including Sweden, Denmark and Norway, Russia, and Japan.Kokatsu, Reiko.Women In-Between: Asian Women Artists 1984-2012. Japan, Fukuoka Asian Art Museum, 2012. Women artists from Asia, Africa and particularly Eastern Europe emerged in large numbers onto the international art scene in the late 1980s and 1990s as contemporary art became popular worldwide.Huangfu, Binghui.(ed).Text and Sub-Text(Singapore: Lasalle-SIA University, 2000).

Major exhibitions of contemporary women artists include WACK! Art and the Feminist Revolution curated by Connie Butler, SF MOMA, 2007, Global Feminisms curated by Linda Nochlin and Maura Reilly at the Brooklyn Museum, 2007, Rebelle, curated by Mirjam Westen at MMKA, Arnheim, 2009, Kiss Kiss Bang Bang! 45 Years of Art and Feminism curated by Xavier Arakistan at Bilbao Fine Arts Museum, 2007, Elles at Centre Pompidou in Paris (2009-2011), which also toured to Seattle Art Museum. have been increasingly international in their selection. This shift is also reflected in journals set up in the 1990s like n.paradoxa.

Artists: 20th - 21st Century

 Marina Abramović (born 1946)
 Eija-Liisa Ahtila (born 1959)
 Ghada Amer (born 1963)
 Laurie Anderson (born 1947)
 Janine Antoni (born 1964)
 Vanessa Beecroft (born 1969)
 Cosima von Bonin (born 1962)
 Louise Bourgeois (1911-2010)
 Angela Bulloch (born 1966)
 Sophie Calle (born 1953)
 Judy Chicago (born 1939)
 Lygia Clark (1920-1988)
 Hanne Darboven (1941-2009)
 Sonia Delaunay (1885-1979)
 Orshi Drozdik (born 1946)
 Marlene Dumas (born 1953)
 Tracey Emin (born 1963)
 Valie Export (born 1940)
 Sylvie Fleury (born 1961)
 Katharina Fritsch (born 1956)
 Ellen Gallagher (born 1965)
 Isa Genzken (born 1948)
 Nan Goldin (born 1953)
 Natalia Goncharova (1881-1962)
 Renée Green (born 1959)
 Asta Gröting (born 1961)
 Guerrilla Girls (born 1985)
 Mona Hatoum (born 1952)
 Barbara Hepworth (1903-1975)
 Lynn Hershman (born 1941)
 Eva Hesse (1936-1970)
 Hannah Wilke (1940-1993)
 Hannah Höch (1889-1978)
 Candida Höfer (born 1944)
 Nancy Holt (1938-2014)
 Rebecca Horn (born 1944)
 Frida Kahlo (1907-1954)
 Toba Khedoori (born 1964)
 Karen Kilimnik (born 1955)
 Shirin Neshat (born 1957)
 Ana Mendieta (1948-1985)
 Orlan (born 1947)
 Valie Export (born 1940)
 Yoko Ono (born 1933)
 Carolee Schneeman (1939-2019)
 Yayoi Kusama (born 1929)
 Barbara Kruger (born 1945)
 Suzy Lake (born 1947)
 Jenny Holzer (born 1950)
 Cindy Sherman (born 1957)
 Kara Walker (born 1969)
 Adrian Piper (born 1948)
 Amal Kenawy (1974-2012)
 Andrea Fraser (born 1965)
 Coco Fusco (born 1960)
 Emily Jacir (born 1970)
 Larissa Sansour (born 1973)
 Laurie Simmons (born 1949)
 Faith Ringgold (born 1930)
 Carrie Mae Weems (born 1953)
 Mickalene Thomas (born 1971)
 Sherrie Levine (born 1947)
 Mimi Smith (born 1942)

 Artist Collectives 

 Guerilla Girls (founded 1985)
 Speaking of I.M.E.L.D.A. 
 SOHO20
 Las Damas de Arte (founded 1971)
 Spiderwoman Theater (founded 1976) 
 Ridykeulos collective (founded 2005)
 Pussy Riot 
 Ni Santas (founded 2016)
 iQhiya
 Mujeres de Maiz

See also

 Cyberfeminism
 Feminism in 1950s Britain
 Feminist art
 Feminist art criticism
 Feminist art movement in the United States
 Historiography
 List of 20th century women artists
 n.paradoxa
 Postmodern feminism
Timeline of the Feminist art movement in New Zealand
 Women Artists
 Women's Art Movement, in Australia 1970s–1980s

 References 

Further reading
 
 Juan Vicente Aliaga Gender Battle/A Battala dos Xeneros Spain, Santiago de Compostela, 2007.
 Juan Aliaga and Maria Laura Rosa Recuperar la Memoria: Experiencias feministas desde el Arte, Argentina y Espana, Ana Navarette and Mujeres Publicas Centro Cultural de Espana, Buenos Aires and CCEBE, Sede Parana, 2013. 
 L. Anderson, A. Livion Ingvarsson, M. Jensner, A. Nystrom, B.Werkmeister, N. Ostlind (eds.) Konstfeminism Helsingborg, Sweden, Dunkers Kulturhaus and Lilevalch Konsthall, 2004. 
 Kathy Battista Re-Negotiating the Body: Feminist Art in 1970s London, I B Tauris, 2011.    
 Carla Bianpoen, Farah Wardani, Wulan Dirgantoro Indonesian Women Artists Jakarta: Yayasan Semirupa Indonesia:2007.
 Katy Deepwell (ed) New Feminist Art Criticism: Critical Strategies UK, Manchester, Manchester University Press, 1995.
 Sylvia Eiblmayr Die Frau als Bild: Der weibliche Körper in der Kunst des 20 Jahrhunderts Berlin, Dietrich Reimer, 1993.
 Isabelle Graw Die bessere Hälfte: Künstlerinnen des 20. und 21. Jahrhunderts Cologne, du Mont Verlag, 2003.
 Uta Grosenick (ed.) "Women Artists in the 20th and 21st Century" Köln: Taschen GmbH, 2001.
 Karen Hindsbo The Beginning is Always Today': Scandinavian feminist art from the last 20 years Norway: Saarlandets Kunstmuseum, 2013.
 Johanna Householder and Tanya Mars (eds) Caught in the Act: an Anthology of Performance Art by Canadian Women  Toronto:YYZ Books, 2003.  
 Lucy Lippard From the Center:Feminist Essays on Women's Art New York. Dutton, 1976.
 Rozsika Parker and Griselda Pollock Framing Feminism: Art and the Women's Movement, 1970-1985 London. Pandora/RKP, 1987.
 Bojana Pejic (ed) The Gender Check Reader Vienna, MUMOK and Erste Foundation, 2010
 Griselda Pollock (ed) Generations and Geographies London, Routledge, 1996.
 Helena Reckitt (ed) Art and Feminism London, Phaidon, 2001 
 Hilary Robinson (ed) Visibly Female London, Camden Press, 1987
 Hilary Robinson (ed)  Feminism – Art – Theory: An Anthology, 1968-2000 Oxford. Blackwells, 2001.
 Araceli Barbosa Sanchez  Arte Feminista en los ochenta en Mexico: una perspectiva de genero Mexico: Casa Juan Pablos Centro Cultural, Universidad Autonoma de Estado de Morelos, 2008.
 Ella Shohat (ed) Talking Visions: Multicultural Feminism in a Transnational Age Cambridge, Massachusetts, MIT:1998  
 Bridget Tracy Tan Women Artists in Singapore  Singapore, Select Books and Singapore Art Museum, 2011.
 Jayne Wark Radical Gestures: Feminism and Performance Art in North America  Montreal: McGill-Queen's University Press, 2006. 
 Women Down the Pub (a.k.a. N.Debois Buhl, L.Strombeck, A.Sonjasdotter)  Udsight – Feministiske Strategier i Dansk Billedkunst / View – Feminist Strategies in Danish Visual Art''  Denmark, Informations Vorla, 2004.

Contemporary art movements
Feminist theory
Feminist artists
Feminist theatre
Political art